The City of Moe was a local government area about  east-southeast of Melbourne, the state capital of Victoria, Australia.

History

Moe was, for most of its history, part of the Shire of Narracan, which was first incorporated in 1878. Its growth as an industrial centre, due to nearby coal-mining in the Latrobe Valley, resulted in a boom in population, and ultimately in its severance and incorporation as the Borough of Moe on 28 August 1955. On 6 March 1963, it was proclaimed a city. On 1 October 1990, further land was annexed to the city from Narracan.

On 2 December 1994, the City of Moe was abolished, and along with the Cities of Morwell and Traralgon, the Shire of Traralgon, and parts of the Shires of Narracan and Rosedale, was merged into the newly created Shire of La Trobe.

Wards

The City of Moe was divided into three wards, each of which elected three councillors:
 Centre Riding
 East Riding
 West Riding

Towns and localities
 Moe*
 Moe South
 Newborough

* Council seat.

Population

* Estimate in the 1958 Victorian Year Book.

References

External links
 Victorian Places - Moe

Moe